Black Peppa is the stage name of Akeem Adams, a drag performer most known for competing on series 4 of RuPaul's Drag Race UK .

Early life 
Adams was born in Saint Martin. He relocated to Birmingam in 2014.

Career
Black Peppa competed on series 4 of RuPaul's Drag Race UK . Their debut single "Why Is She Calling?" was released in November 2022.

Personal life
Black Peppa is Black and identifies as non-binary and queer. Mo Heart is Black Peppa's "drag mother". According to Entertainment Weekly, Black Peppa's drag name "was inspired by both the TV series Peppa Pig and her mother's spicy Caribbean dishes".

Discography

Singles
 "Why Is She Calling?" (2022)

Filmography

Television
RuPaul's Drag Race UK (series 4)

References

Living people
British drag queens
British LGBT people
Non-binary drag performers
People from Birmingham, West Midlands
Queer people
Sint Maarten expatriates in the United Kingdom
LGBT Black British people
English non-binary people